"Please Don't Stop Loving Me" is a song first recorded by Elvis Presley as part of the soundtrack for his 1966 motion picture Frankie and Johnny.

It was also in 1966 released as a B-side to "Frankie and Johnny", the title song of the same movie. Both songs charted on the Billboard Hot 100. "Please Don't Stop Loving Me'" peaked in it at number 45 on the week of April 23, 1966.

The song also reached the top 10 in Israel.

Musical style and lyrics 
The song was published by Elvis Presley Music, Inc.

According to the book Elvis Films FAQ, "Please Don't Stop Loving Me" was influenced by the song "Non ho l'età (Per amarti)" ("I'm Too Young to Love You"), with which Gigliola Cinquetti won the Eurovision Song Contest in 1964. The book states that "although the chorus is completely different in "Please Don't Stop Loving Me," the similarity between the melody and the verses is striking".

Charts

References 

1966 songs
1966 singles
Elvis Presley songs
RCA Records singles
Songs written by Joy Byers
Songs written for films